Groveland Township may refer to one of the following places in the State of Illinois:

Groveland Township, LaSalle County, Illinois
Groveland Township, Tazewell County, Illinois

See also

Groveland Township (disambiguation)

Illinois township disambiguation pages